The  or "White Horse Society" was a fluid late Meiji association of Japanese practitioners of yōga or Western-style painting. Established in June 1896, thirteen exhibitions were staged before the Society was disbanded in 1911 (the missing years being 1906, 1908, and 1911). Other participating and exhibiting artists included Yamamoto Hōsui, Okada Saburōsuke, Wada Eisaku, Aoki Shigeru, and Fujishima Takeji.

Gallery

See also

 Nihonga
 Reminiscence of the Tempyō Era

References

External links 
  Contemporary newspaper articles relating to the Hakuba-kai

Schools of Japanese art